Vladimir Balthasar (June 21, 1897 – November 10, 1978) was a Czech entomologist, naturalist, and ornithologist who specialized in beetles.

Between 1933 and 1939, he was employed at the Natural History Museum in Bratislava. His insect collection is found at the National Museum in Prague.

The author name Balthasar can be used for Vladimir Balthasar in connection with a scientific name in Zoology.

References 

Czechoslovak entomologists
1897 births
1978 deaths
Scientists from Prague
Coleopterists